R29 or R-29 may refer to:

Roads 
 R-29 regional road (Montenegro)
 R29 (South Africa)

Other uses 
 R29 (New York City Subway car)
 AEKKEA-RAAB R-29, a Greek fighter aircraft
 HMA R.29, an airship of the Royal Air Force
 , a destroyer of the Royal Navy
 R29: Contact with water liberates toxic gas, a risk phrase
 R-29 Vysota, a family of Soviet submarine-launched ballistic missiles
 Refinery29, an American entertainment website
 Renault R29, a Formula One racing car
 Tumansky R-29, a Soviet turbojet engine